The Black Halos are a Vancouver, British Columbia-based punk rock band. Their music also includes some glam rock.

History
The band was founded in 1993 by lead singer Billy Hopeless and guitarist Rich Jones, and at first, was called The Black Market Babies (not to be confused with the American band with the similar name). With the addition of Matt Camirand, Jay Millette and Rob Zgaljic, they released their first album, Black Halos in 1999. They then toured the USA, playing with Nikki Sudden, the Lazy Cowgirls, L7 and The Hellacopters, among others.

In 2001, they released the album The Violent Years, on Sub Pop Records. They toured around Canada with The Offspring and Millencolin, and played Edgefest and the Warped Tour.  In 2009, the song "No Tomorrow Girls", from The Violent Years, was featured in the Xbox 360-exclusive racing video game Forza Motorsport 3.

The band then had some major line-up changes, when Camirand left to join Blood Meridian,  and Jones left to join Amen. They were replaced by guitarist Adam Becvare and bassist Denyss McKnight.

In 2005, they signed with Liquor & Poker Music, released the album Alive Without Control  and headed off for a 7-week, 40-show tour of Europe.

In 2007, The Black Halos signed with History Music and, in 2008, released their fourth album, We Are Not Alone. By this time, the band consisted of Hopeless, Zgaljic, Becvare, Johnny Stewart and Jahmeel "JR" Russell. They played Canadian Music Week and went on tour with Social Distortion. Later that year, while on tour, the band's van, gear and merchandise were stolen, and they decided to break up. 

The band reformed in 2016, with Hopeless, Jones and some new members, and began playing sold-out shows, including a concert at Toronto's Bovine Sex Club during Canadian Music Week 2019. Some singles followed, including 2020's "Ain’t No Good Time to Say Goodbye", which was written upon the death of Hopeless' close friend, SNFU frontman and punk icon Ken Chinn (aka Mr. Chi Pig). The band is now original members Billy Hopeless, Jay Millette and Rich Jones in addition to new members Danni Action and John Kerns. In 2020, they independently released the 17-track album F.F.T.S. - Demos & Rarities, a collection of demos and rare tracks going back as far as 1996. In 2021, they released the EP Uncommonwealth. In November 2022, the band released their first full-length album since 2008, How the Darkness Doubled.

Discography

Albums
The Black Halos (1999), Die Young Stay Pretty Records
The Violent Years (2001), Sub-Pop Records
Alive Without Control (2005), Liquor and Poker Music, People Like You Records 
The Violent Years (2007, compilation), People Like You Records
We Are Not Alone (2008), History Music, People Like You Records
F.F.T.S. - Demos & Rarities (2020), Independent
How the Darkness Doubled (2022), Stomp Records

EPs
XMas 2001 EP (2001, split with Bubble), Basement Boys Records
Uncommonwealth (2021), Cursed Blessing Records

Singles
 "Retro World" / "1010" (1999), Devil Doll Records
 "Jane Doe" / "Russian Roulette" (2000), Sub-Pop Records
 "Sell Out Love" / "It's Over For You" (2000), Safety Pin Records
 "Homeless For Christmas" / "You Better Know By Now What I Want For Christmas" (2000), Sympathy for the Record Industry
 "Fossil Fuel" / "Geisterbahn II" (2016), Independent
 "Geisterbahn II" / "Tandem Drown" (2019), Yeah Right!
 "Ain't No Good Time To Say Goodbye" / "Rusty Rake" (2020), Yeah Right!

Members
Current members
Billy Hopeless - vocals
Rich Jones - guitars
Jay Millette - guitar
Danni Action - Drums
John Kerns - Bass

Former members
 
Adam Becvare - guitar
Johnny Stewart - guitar
Jahmeel "JR" Russell - bass
Rob Zgaljic - drums
Denyss McKnight - bass
Matt Camirand - bass
C.C. Voltage - bass
Davey French - guitar
Robbie Hunter - bass
Make Up Mike aka M.U.M. - drums

References

External links
[ The Black Halos] at Allmusic.com
The Black Halos on Myspace

Canadian punk rock groups
Musical groups from Vancouver
Musical groups established in 1993
Musical groups disestablished in 2008
Musical quartets
1993 establishments in British Columbia
2008 disestablishments in British Columbia
Sub Pop artists
Liquor and Poker Music artists